The Mumbai Telugus are a social community of Telugu language speakers living in Mumbai, the Financial capital of India. There are about 5 lakh Telugu speakers in Mumbai. This includes both those who are born in Mumbai, and those born in Andhra Pradesh/Telangana or elsewhere in the Telugu diaspora. They are one of the major communities in Mumbai today.

History 
The Telugu community's links with Maharashtra date back to Chhatrapati Shivaji's times. Old records say that the major batch of Telugus arrived in Maharashtra in the 17th century. A devastating famine and the Razakar excesses in Hyderabad fueled fresh migration to Mumbai in the early part of the 20th century when the city was in the midst of a textile/real estate boom, and hectic construction activity.

Many joined textile mills, most of them Padmashalis, a sub-caste known for its weaving-spinning skills. Others toiled to build Mumbai landmarks such as the Metro cinema and the art-deco apartments in south Mumbai. Sayajirao Silam and Narasimha Puppala, Mumbai's leading political figures in the 1950s, were Telugus.

Due to 2000's IT boom, there has been significant increase in floating of Telugu software professionals to Mumbai city.

References

Ethnic groups in Mumbai
Telugu people
Internal migrations in India